The Manitou River is a river flowing in the unorganized territory of Lac-Jérôme and in the municipality of Rivière-au-Tonnerre, in the Minganie Regional County Municipality, in the Côte-Nord region in the province of Quebec, Canada.

It flows through largely unspoiled wilderness, and has spectacular falls nears its mouth.

Although there is hydroelectric potential, projects to develop the river in this way have met popular resistance, and instead it has been proposed to protect the river with a national part or indigenous reserve.

Course

The Manitou River has its origin in Lac Caobus in the unorganized territory of Lac-Jérôme, Minganie Regional County Municipality, and lower down flows through the municipality of Rivière-au-Tonnerre, Minganie.
The river flows south, widening in two places to form Lake Manitou and Eudist Lake.
It reaches the Saint Lawrence in the Canton de Coopman, near the community of Manitou halfway between Sept-Îles and Havre-Saint-Pierre.
The river basin lies between that of the Tortue River to the west and the Chaloupe River to the east.

There was a proposal in May 2001 to build 36 small (less than 50 MW) hydroelectric power stations on rivers throughout Quebec, including the Manitou.
Due to popular pressure, most of the projects were abandoned.
It has been proposed to instead make it a national park, or else a reserve, since the territory is claimed by the Innu.

Name

The name is based on the belief among several indigenous people that the manitou represents the powers of life, and is the great spirit, and that the manitou is in the waterfall. The phrase Tché-Manitou means "good spirit" while Matchi-Manitou means "bad spirit" or "devil". Manitou is the French form of the word, while the English used the forms manitto, manetto or manitoa.

The name is common throughout Quebec except in the region south of the Saint Lawrence, and is even found in Inuit territories in the hybrid form Manitounuk.

The toponym "Manitou River" was formalized on December 5, 1968 at the Commission de toponymie du Québec.

Chute Manitou

There is a tourist information center at the Chute Manitou, with a parking lot and picnic tables.
At the fall the river is flanked on either side by trails through the boreal forest.
The La Chute trail, which goes down to the bottom of the falls, has wooden stairs in places and landings giving views of the falls at different levels, including one with a height of almost .
A small part of the trail passes over a red granite beach.
The trails to the falls were closed in June 2017 for safety-related improvements.

River basin

Lower down the basin is narrower.
The basin is divided between the unorganized territory of Rivière-Nipissis in the Sept-Rivières RCM (9.4%), and the unorganized territory of Lac-Jérôme (88.7%) and the municipality of Rivière-au-Tonnerre  (1.9%) in the Miganie RCM.

Along the southern shore there is a steep escarpment.
North of the piedmont the Laurentian plateau region covers more than half the watershed.

The bedrock includes eight types of magmatic or metamorphosed rock complexes: mixed paragneiss, granite and pegmatite, anorthosite, granitoid rocks, granodiorite and charnockite gneisses, gabbro and migmatite.
However, there are significant layers of glacial tills and glaciofluvial sediments in the alluvial valleys.
In the coastal plain the Goldthwait Sea, which advanced after the last ice age and then retreated when the land rebounded from the weight of the ice, left large quantities of clay and silt sediments.
These were later covered by deltaic sandy sediments.

Hydrology

The streams and rivers in the north follow angular courses dictated by fractures in the hard bedrock, with straight line segments meeting at right angles.
In the center the courses become more winding, and sometimes meander, as they flow through old U-shaped glacial valleys.

In the coastal plain the Manitou River has cut a straight valley through the soft sediments.
Tributaries include the Lavaivre River, which drains the northwest of the watershed, the Lloyd and Trout rivers, which drain the west-central portion and the Little Manitou River, which drains the east-central portion.

Waterbodies cover 9.99% of the basin.
There are three large lakes.

Environment

Further north, peat bogs are found only in the foot of valleys, and are mostly uniform and covered by shrubs.
In the north, the section on the Canadian Shield is partly covered by fens.
The forest has never been exploited except in a small area in 1910–1920, which is now colonized with hardwood.
Otherwise the vegetation is typical of the region.
There was another large fire along the railway in 1961–1970.

The number of fish species is estimated at 27.
The river does not have the status of a salmon river, although the fish may enter the river estuary below the falls.
It is estimated that up to 139 species of birds may nest in the watershed, taking advantage of the vast peat bogs of the coastal plain and the stretches of still water.
Cliffs near the Eudistes,  and Manitou lakes also provide potential habitat for birds of prey.

Access would be by float plane, and camping sites would have to be prepared.

Notes

Sources

Rivers of Côte-Nord